"La Folie" is a 1981 song by The Stranglers. The title track from La Folie, it was released as the follow up to "Golden Brown" in April 1982, and peaked at number 47 in the UK Singles Chart.  Sung in French by bassist Jean-Jacques Burnel, it was Burnel who convinced his bandmates of the song's potential as a single, despite Hugh Cornwell feeling that "Tramp" was the better choice. The song makes allusions to Japanese necrophiliac murderer and cannibal Issei Sagawa.

The music video was filmed on the Montmartre.

References

1982 singles
The Stranglers songs
1981 songs
Songs written by Hugh Cornwell
Songs written by Jean-Jacques Burnel
Songs written by Dave Greenfield
Songs written by Jet Black
Liberty Records singles